Woodstock railway station in Woodstock, Ontario, Canada, is a railway station for Via Rail trains running from Toronto west to Windsor.

The station is located between Wellington and Bay Streets. Trains are wheelchair accessible (immediate for eastbound passengers but 24 hours' notice required for westbound passengers). It opens as a shelter 30 minutes prior to train arrival and remains open for 30 minutes after train departure. The ticket counter has been replaced by a self-service kiosk. There is free outdoor parking on the premises.

Nearby attractions include Southside Park and the Woodstock Museum.

History
The station was built in 1885 by the Grand Trunk Railway after its acquisition of the Great Western Railway, which was purchased in 1882 and ultimately merged into the Canadian National Railway in 1920. The building is Gothic Revival with Italianate elements by architect Joseph Hobson and renovated in 1986 with Edwardian themed interior/exterior. The station building was designated a Heritage Railway Station in 1993.

See also

 List of designated heritage railway stations of Canada

References

External links

Woodstock Railway Station

Via Rail stations in Ontario
Rail transport in Woodstock, Ontario
Great Western Railway (Ontario)
Canadian National Railway stations in Ontario
Designated heritage railway stations in Ontario
Railway stations in Oxford County, Ontario
History of rail transport in Oxford County, Ontario